Fons Gemmel (born 21 March 2001) is a Dutch professional footballer who plays as a right-back for Tweede Divisie club OFC Oostzaan.

Club career
On 10 May 2020, Gemmel signed his first professional contract with Jong AZ. He made his professional debut with Jong AZ in a 2–1 Eerste Divisie loss to Jong Utrecht on 14 September 2020.

Personal life
Born in the Netherlands, Gemmel is of Indonesian descent through his mother.

References

External links
 

2001 births
Living people
Footballers from Amsterdam
Dutch footballers
Dutch people of Indonesian descent
Association football fullbacks
Jong AZ players
OFC Oostzaan players
Eerste Divisie players
Tweede Divisie players